This is an incomplete list of works by the German painter, Georg Baselitz.

Works

References 

 

Baselitz, Georg